Amblyacrum is a genus of extinct minute sea snails, marine gastropod mollusks or micromollusks in the family Mangeliidae.

Species
Species within the genus Amblyacrum include:
 † Amblyacrum adrienpeyroti Lozouet, 2017 
 † Amblyacrum bernayi Cossmann, 1889
  † Amblyacrum dameriacense (Deshayes, 1865)
 † Amblyacrum exiguum (Peyrot, 1931) 
 † Amblyacrum gougeroti (J. K. Tucker & Le Renard, 1993) 
 † Amblyacrum otites Lozouet, 2017 
 † Amblyacrum tabulatum (Conrad, 1833)
 † Amblyacrum tauziedense Lozouet, 2017 
Species brought into synonymy
 † Amblyacrum rugosum (Deshayes, 1834): synonym of † Amblyacrum gougeroti (J. K. Tucker & Le Renard, 1993) 
 † Amblyacrum tauziedensis Lozouet, 2017 : synonym of † Amblyacrum tauziedense Lozouet, 2017  (wrong gender agreement of specific epithet)

References

 Cossmann (M.), 1893 Notes complémentaires sur la faune éocènique de l'Alabama. Annales de Géologie et de Paléontologie, t. 12, p. 3-51
 Wenz (W.), 1943 Handbuch der Paläozoologie. Gastropoda, 6., p. 1201-1506
 Powell (A.W.B.), 1966 The Molluscan families Speightiidae and Turridae. An evaluation of the valid taxa, both Recent and fossil, with lists of characteristic species. Bulletin of the Auckland Institute and Museum, n°5, p. 5-184
 Le Renard (J.) & Pacaud (J.-M.), 1995 Révision des Mollusques paléogènes du Bassin de Paris. 2 - Liste des références primaires des espèces. Cossmanniana, t. 3, vol. 3, p. 65-132

External links
 Cossmann M. (1889). Catalogue illustré des coquilles fossiles de l'Éocène des environs de Paris. Annales de la Société Royale Malacologique de Belgique. 24: 3-381, 12 pls